Habrocampulum is a genus of parasitoid wasps belonging to the family Ichneumonidae.

The species of this genus are found in Europe.

Species:
 Habrocampulum biguttatum (Gravenhorst, 1829)
 Habrocampulum shikaribetsensis Uchida, 1958

References

Ichneumonidae
Ichneumonidae genera